Waterford Village Historic District may refer to:

Waterford Village Historic District (Waterford, Michigan), listed on the National Register of Historic Places (NRHP) in Oakland County
Waterford Village Historic District (Waterford, New York), listed on the NRHP in Saratoga County

See also
Waterford (disambiguation)